Log is a settlement in the Municipality of Kranjska Gora in the Upper Carniola region of Slovenia. Development has resulted in a contiguous built-up area connecting Log and Kranjska Gora.

References

External links

Log on Geopedia

Populated places in the Municipality of Kranjska Gora